Nordstoga is a surname. Notable people with the surname include:

Aasmund Nordstoga (born 1964), Norwegian musician, singer, and composer
Kåre Nordstoga (born 1954), Norwegian organist
Odd Nordstoga (born 1972), Norwegian folk singer, musician, actor, and editor

Norwegian-language surnames